Nennhausen is a municipality in the Havelland district, in Brandenburg, Germany. It consists of the Ortsteile (villages) Bamme, Buckow, Damme, Gräningen, Liepe and Mützlitz.

Demography

References

Localities in Havelland